The surnames Kuliev, Kuliyev, Kouliev, etc. are derived from the variants of the Turkic Quli. 

The surname Guliev is of the same origin, and  both can be transliterated from the native languages as Quliyev. 

They may refer to:

Alim Kouliev
Awdy Kulyýew 
Azamat Kuliev
Begençmuhammet Kulyýew
Eldar Kuliev
Eldar Kuliyev
Kaisyn Kuliev
Rafat Kuliev

See also
Kuliev Cavalry Group

Patronymic surnames